The Hueco Mountains are a range of mountains that rise in southern Otero County, New Mexico and extend  south into Texas, generally along the El Paso–Hudspeth county line just east of the city of El Paso, Texas. The highest point of the range is the Cerro Alto Mountain  in Hudspeth County.

Shallow, stony soils in the Hueco Mountains support oak, juniper, and some mesquite. The mountains were part of the Rocky Mountain trend, forced upward as part of the Laramide mountain-building period during the late Cretaceous, 60 to 70 million years ago.

The word hueco is Spanish for hollow, gap, or hole.

References

Mountain ranges of New Mexico
Mountain ranges of Texas
Geography of El Paso, Texas
Landforms of Hudspeth County, Texas
Mountain ranges of Otero County, New Mexico
Mountain ranges of El Paso County, Texas